Riding the Rails is a 1938 Fleischer Studios animated short film featuring Betty Boop and Pudgy the Pup. Although some sources claim that this film was nominated for an Academy Award, it does not appear in the official Academy Awards database.

The film inspired a large variety of collectibles in the 1930s, although originals are now rare to find.

Synopsis
Film Daily called the film "subway fun", and gave the following synopsis:
"The exciting adventures of Betty Boop's dog, Pudgy, who insists on following his mistress when she goes downtown in the subway. He gets on the train, and then his troubles begin. After almost disrupting the train service, he is flung off, and is forced to walk the tracks back to the station, with trains whizzing down on him from all directions. When he finally arrives safely back home, he is cured of wanting to trail around town with Betty."

References

External links
 Riding the Rails on Youtube
 Riding the Rails cartoon on the official Betty Boop website
 Riding the Rails at The Big Cartoon Database.
 

1938 films
Betty Boop cartoons
1930s American animated films
American black-and-white films
1938 animated films
Paramount Pictures short films
Fleischer Studios short films
Short films directed by Dave Fleischer
Rail transport films